Mary Carter Reitano (née Carter; born 29 November 1934) is a former tennis player from Australia.

As a junior player she won the girls' singles title at the Australian Championships in 1951 and 1952.

Reitano won the singles title at the 1956 Australian Championships, defeating Thelma Long in the final in three sets after surviving a match point in the third set. At the 1959 Australian Championships Reitano won her second singles title after a straight-sets victory in the final against Renée Schuurman. Additionally she reached the Australian semifinals in six other occasions. She teamed with Margaret Court to win the women's doubles title there in 1961. Reitano teamed with three different partners to be the runner-up in women's doubles at the 1956, 1959, and 1962 Australian Championships.  Reitano also was the runner-up in mixed doubles at the 1961 Australian Championships.

In February 1958 she married Sydney Reitano. She became a coaching professional in 1962.

Grand Slam tournament finals

Singles (2 titles)

Doubles (1 title, 3 runners-up)

Mixed doubles (1 runner-up)

Grand Slam singles tournament timeline

See also 
 Performance timelines for all female tennis players who reached at least one Grand Slam final

References

External links
 

1934 births
Living people
Australian Championships (tennis) champions
Australian female tennis players
Grand Slam (tennis) champions in women's singles
Grand Slam (tennis) champions in women's doubles
Grand Slam (tennis) champions in girls' singles
Place of birth missing (living people)
Australian Championships (tennis) junior champions